Battlefront is a wargame developed by Strategic Studies Group and published by Matrix Games for Microsoft Windows in 2007. The game is a turn-based strategy set in World War II. It is the namesake of an earlier game released by Strategic Studies Group in 1986.

Gameplay 
Battlefront is a battalion-level simulation wargame and contains four scenarios that depict battles of World War II. The scenarios are based on Battle of Gazala, Operation Market Garden, Battle of Saipan, and Novorossiysk Defensive Operation. The player can control forces of either Axis or Allied powers. Parameters like fog of war, weather, supply and reinforcements can be changed for every scenario.

Reception 
Larry Levandowski of Armchair General praised Battlefront for its scenarios, AI and interface. He stated that "the real point to the game is good old-fashioned war game goodness, and this is where the game stands out". Konstantin Fomin of Absolute Games rated the game 75% noting its dated graphics and lack of innovations, but praising gameplay and difficulty. The Wargamer gave Battlefront an Award for Excellence, describing it as "immersive and reasonably challenging".

References

2007 video games
Strategic Studies Group games
Windows games
Windows-only games
Computer wargames
Turn-based strategy video games
Video games developed in Australia
World War II video games
Matrix Games games
Multiplayer and single-player video games